Perunthanni is a suburb of Thiruvananthapuram, the capital of the Indian state of Kerala. This place is situated on Vetti Muricha Kotta-Westfort-Enchakkal Road.

Geography
It is located at.

Places near Perunthanni
Perunthanni surrounded by Palkulanagara, Eanchakkal and Sreekanteswaram.

Religion
The population of Perunthanni mainly practices Hinduism.

Main Landmarks
 West Fort 
 NSS Public School 
 NSS Arts College for Women
 Arumana Hospital 
 Archives Office

References

External links

  NSS Public School Official Website

Suburbs of Thiruvananthapuram